McArthur-Martin Hexadecagon Barn is a historic barn located at Bloomville in Delaware County, New York, United States. It includes the 16-sided portion of the barn, calf wing and driveway, driveway ramp with stone embankment, two round silos and a frame addition.  The barn was built in 1883 and is a three-story frame structure, 100 feet in diameter.

It was listed on the National Register of Historic Places in 1984.

See also
National Register of Historic Places listings in Delaware County, New York

It meets definition of a round barn, being nearly round.

References

Round barns in New York (state)
National Register of Historic Places in Delaware County, New York
Infrastructure completed in 1883
Buildings and structures in Delaware County, New York